"I'm Housin" is the third and final single released from EPMD's debut album, Strictly Business. It peaked at 28 on the Hot Rap Singles. In 2000, alternative metal band Rage Against the Machine made a cover of the song on their album Renegades.

"I'm Housin" features a prominent sample of "Rock Steady" by Aretha Franklin.

Single track listing

A-Side
"I'm Housin'" (Vocal)- 4:15
"I'm Housin'" (Instrumental)- 4:11
"I'm Housin'" (U.K. Mix)- 5:30

B-Side
"Get Off the Bandwagon" (Vocal)- 5:07
"Get Off the Bandwagon" (Instrumental)- 5:03

1989 singles
EPMD songs
1988 songs
Songs written by Erick Sermon
Rage Against the Machine songs
Songs written by PMD (rapper)